Will Bartholomew (born October 1, 1978 in Nashville, Tennessee) is a former American Football fullback and now CEO of D1 Sports.

Playing history

College
Bartholomew played college football for the Tennessee Volunteers football team, earning many honors including 2001 SEC Good Works Team, Verizon Academic All-District IV, Academic All-SEC; 2000 Academic All-SEC; 1999 Academic All-SEC; and 1998 Academic All-SEC.  He functioned primarily as a "blocking" back for the team.

Professional
As an undrafted free agent, Bartholomew was to play in the National Football League for the Denver Broncos.  Bartholomew's career ended after suffering a knee injury during training camp that required multiple extensive surgeries.

Business
Bartholomew is the founder & CEO of D1 Sports, a training and therapy company dedicated to being The PLACE for the ATHLETE.

Personal life
Bartholomew's brother, Ben, also played for the Tennessee Volunteers.

References

External links
 D1 Sports Training company website
 Football Speakers Will Bartholomew bio

1978 births
Living people
American football fullbacks
Denver Broncos players
Tennessee Volunteers football players
Players of American football from Tennessee